A. sacchari may refer to:

Abacarus sacchari, a species of mite
Aceria sacchari, a species of mite in the genus Aceria
Acrolophus sacchari , a species of moth
Alicyclobacillus sacchari, a Gram-positive bacterium
Aspergillus sacchari, a species of mold in the genus Aspergillus